An underground hangar is a type of hangar for military aircraft, usually dug into the side of a mountain for protection. It is bigger and more protected than a hardened aircraft shelter (HAS).

An underground hangar complex may include tunnels containing the normal elements of a military air base - fuel storage, weapon storage, rooms for maintaining the aircraft systems, a communications centre, briefing rooms, kitchen, dining rooms, sleeping areas and generators for electrical power.

Countries that have used underground hangars include Albania, China, Italy, North Korea, Norway, Sweden, Switzerland, Taiwan, Yugoslavia and Iran.

By country

Israel
Eight Israeli air force F-16I Sufa fighter aircraft were damaged in the winter of early 2020 by flooding when they were improperly left inside underground  hangars in a Negev desert airbase during severe flooding. 
The Washington Post reported in 2012 based on the results FOIA requests to the US government that the US Army Corps of Engineers brought in US construction contractors to build installations in the south of Israel including underground hangars for fighter-bombers as a part of US military aid to Israel.

Italy 
Built in World War II on the Island of Pantelleria.

Sweden

In 1941 the Swedish Air Force began building its first underground hangar at Göta Wing (F 9), located near Gothenburg in south-west Sweden, it was commissioned in 1944. After World War II plans were made up for building underground hangars at every air force base that had suitable rock conditions. These ambitious building plans proved to be too expensive and were reduced to hangars at certain select air bases. A second underground hangar was built in 1947 at Södertörn Wing (F 18). After that plans were finalized for building underground hangars capable of surviving close hits by tactical nuclear weapons. This required that these new hangars be much deeper, with 25 to 30 meters of rock cover, and heavy-duty blast doors in concrete. The Saab 37 Viggen aircraft was designed with a folding tail fin to fit into low hangars.  The Aeroseum, an aircraft museum open to the public in Gothenburg, is housed in the larger cold war era Underground Hangar at Säve.

Switzerland

Six Flugzeugkaverne (aircraft caverns), each with space for 30 or more aircraft, were constructed for the Swiss Air Force. One at Meiringen Air Base has been expanded to operate F/A-18 Hornet aircraft. Originally, the plan for the aircraft hangar (German "Kavernenflugplatz") included the possibility of launching combat aircraft from the mountain air base. High costs and technical difficulties prevented these plans from being realised. The idea of using roads as runways was later part of the design demands for the Swiss motorway network.

Taiwan
Chiashan Air Force Base, located in Hualien, has an extensive underground hangar system which can accommodate two hundred aircraft.

Chihhang Air Base in Taitung County can accommodate eighty aircraft in underground hangars.

Former Yugoslavia

The "Objekat" series of military installations can be found in secluded but strategically important areas within the former Yugoslavia, and the construction of these military bases were initialized by the SFRJ's defence ministry.

During the Yugoslav Wars, most of these bases were used by the Serbs in certain operations, but due to extenuating circumstances imposed by the Croat forces, they were destroyed and later rendered useless for military use.

Nowadays, they are popular for urban exploration, however it is risky due to the chances of anti-personnel landmines being located in unexplored areas. However, some were spared the destruction due to other circumstances where the Serbs did not control these installations. An example of some that are still in use to this day is the D-0 Armijska Ratna Komanda nuclear bunker in Konjic, however the latter was turned into an art complex, but is still owned by the Ministry of Defence of Bosnia and Herzegovina.

The largest underground hangar complex in former Yugoslavia was at Željava Airport near Bihać, with enough space for 80 MiG-21s.

Slatina Air Base, located at Pristina International Airport, contained the second largest.

North Korea
There are at least twenty major airfields with underground hangars in North Korea, including Onchon air base, Kang Da Ri Airport and Sunchon Airport.

See also
 Highway strip

References

External links

  Armeeschulfilm über die Schweizer Flugzeugkaverne
 "Underground Hangars to  Protect War Planes" Popular Mechanics, September 1937

Underground hangars
Military airbases